Justice Roll may refer to:

Curtis Roll (1884-1970), justice of the Supreme Court of Indiana from 1931 to 1943
Jacob Roll (born 1783) (1783–1870), chief justice of Trondhjem Diocesan Court in Norway from 1828 to 1855

See also
Atle Roll-Matthiesen (1906–?), justice of the Supreme Court of Norway in 1958